Chandra Adi Prakoso (born March 17, 1985), better known as Chand Kelvin, is an Indonesian actor and model. He has starred in several soap operas, such as Bintang and Maha Kasih 2, and several television movies including Santri Bandelz, Cintaku Setebal Kulit Bedug and Cinderella Berubah Wujud.

Filmography

Film

Opera Soap

Film Television

        Suster El

Commercial

Television Show

References

External links

1985 births
Living people
Indonesian male film actors